Reu or REU may refer to:

Places 
Reu, the local name of Retalhuleu, a city in Guatemala
reu, The ISO 3166-1 country code for Réunion
REU, The IATA code for Reus Airport in Catalonia, Spain
 Mount Reu, in Antarctica

People
 Reu, a Biblical figure
 Papa Reu, a performer
 Bishweshwar Nath Reu, a historian
 Johann Michael Reu, a theologian

Other uses
RAM Expansion Unit, the Commodore 1700/1750/1764 series of memory expansion cartridges for Commodore 64/128 home computers
Plekhanov Russian Economic University, a university in Moscow, Russia
Research Experiences for Undergraduates, a U.S. National Science Foundation program for students to take part in active research
Restricted Enforcement Unit, a UK government committee which controls exports of illegal military material from the United Kingdom